Adirondack, a steel-hulled side-wheel river passenger steamship displacing , was built by J. Eaglis and Sons, at Greenpoint, Brooklyn, New York, in 1896, for the Hudson Navigation Company, the "People's Line". Her keel was laid 8 June 1895, and she was launched within five months, probably October 1895, with her fitting out completed in time for the summer 1896 season.

Design

Adirondack had a hull constructed almost entirely out of wood with a single expansion low pressure beam engine. She was built out of wood to give her more flexibility in pushing over the shoals of the upper Hudson River that she would spend her life traversing between New York and Albany. In a day when most ships were using multi-expansion engines the owners went with the cheaper, and simpler, single expansion engine because she would only be used for part of the year making a one-way, ten hour trip, between New York-to-Albany/Albany-to-New York a day, they felt the fuel efficiency and cost of the more complicated engines would not pay for themselves in the long run.

The frames, which were of oak, chestnut and red cedar, were 12 inches thick and are spaced  center to center. There are 11 keelsons of yellow pine, measuring 12 inches by 20 inches, and they were bolted to the frames at each intersection by four bolts. There were three watertight bulkheads, which reach to the main deck. She had four W. & A. Fletcher Company, steam boilers, of only , running a W. & A. Fletcher Company, single expansion engine that produced . The engine turned two  side wheels at an average of 26 revolutions per minute.

Service history
She was chartered by the US Navy for World War I service, delivered on 25 September 1917 she became USS Adirondack (ID 1270), and was officially requisitioned on 16 October 1917. For more than two years, she was employed as a floating barracks attached to the Receiving Ship at the New York Navy Yard, in a noncommissioned status. No longer required after the Armistice.

Adirondack resumed her pre-war operations, serving as a passenger steamer with the Hudson Navigation Co. She was finally abandoned due to age and deterioration during the fiscal year which ended on 30 June 1924.

Notes 

Citations

Bibliography 

Books
 
Online resources
 

Steamships of the United States Navy
Ships built in Brooklyn
1895 ships